Baradari is a local area of Pakistan's biggest city i.e. Karachi. It's located in North Karachi. The famous landmark is Mosque 'Babul Islam Masjid'. Sector 9 and Sector 11-B are adjacent with Baradari. The bus stop there has same name as 'Baradari'.

Neighbourhoods of Karachi